In physics, a ponderomotive force is a nonlinear force that a charged particle experiences in an inhomogeneous oscillating electromagnetic field. It causes the particle to move towards the area of the weaker field strength, rather than oscillating around an initial point as happens in a homogeneous field. This occurs because the particle sees a greater magnitude of force during the half of the oscillation period while it is in the area with the stronger field. The net force during its period in the weaker area in the second half of the oscillation does not offset the net force of the first half, and so over a complete cycle this makes the particle move towards the area of lesser force.

The ponderomotive force Fp is expressed by

which has units of newtons (in SI units) and where e is the electrical charge of the particle, m is its mass, ω is the angular frequency of oscillation of the field, and E is the amplitude of the electric field. At low enough amplitudes the magnetic field exerts very little force.

This equation means that a charged particle in an inhomogeneous oscillating field not only oscillates at the frequency of ω of the field, but is also accelerated by Fp toward the weak field direction. This is a rare case where the sign of the charge on the particle does not change the direction of the force ((-e)2=(+e)2).

Derivation
The derivation of the ponderomotive force expression proceeds as follows.

Consider a particle under the action of a non-uniform electric field oscillating at frequency  in the x-direction. The equation of motion is given by:

neglecting the effect of the associated oscillating magnetic field.

where  is the slow drift motion and  represents fast oscillations. Now, let us also assume that .

, and because  is small, so

On the time scale on which  oscillates,  is essentially a constant. Thus, the above can be integrated to get:

Substituting this in the force equation and averaging over the  timescale, we get,

Thus, we have obtained an expression for the drift motion of a charged particle under the effect of a non-uniform oscillating field.

Time averaged density
Instead of a single charged particle, there could be a gas of charged particles confined by the action of such a force. Such a gas of charged particles is called plasma. The distribution function and density of the plasma will fluctuate at the applied oscillating frequency and to obtain an exact solution, we need to solve the Vlasov Equation. But, it is usually assumed that the time averaged density of the plasma can be directly obtained from the expression for the force expression for the drift motion of individual charged particles:

where  is the ponderomotive potential and is given by

Generalized ponderomotive force
Instead of just an oscillating field, a permanent field could also be present. In such a situation, the force equation of a charged particle becomes:

To solve the above equation, we can make a similar assumption as we did for the case when . This gives a generalized expression for the drift motion of the particle:

Applications
The idea of a ponderomotive description of particles under the action of a time-varying field has applications in areas like:
Combined rf trap
High harmonic generation
Plasma acceleration of particles
Plasma propulsion engine especially the Electrodeless plasma thruster
Quadrupole ion trap
Terahertz time-domain spectroscopy as a source of high energy THz radiation in laser-induced air plasmas

The ponderomotive force also plays an important role in laser induced plasmas as a major density lowering factor. 

ultra-short, intense laser pulse-plasma(target) interaction. Here a new ponderomotive effect comes into play,  
the ponderomotive memory effect. The result is a weakening of the ponderomotive force and the generation of wake fields and ponderomotive streamers. In this case the fast-time averaged density becomes for a Maxwellian plasma:
,

References
General

Citations

Journals

Electrodynamics
Force